Aldo Noé Alvarado Peña (born 7 May 1961) is a Chilean former professional footballer who played as a forward for clubs in Chile and Ecuador.

Career
A product of Santiago Wanderers youth system, he made his professional debut in a match against Unión La Calera on 22 March 1981. He made appearances for the club in 1981 and 1982.

Personal life
He has three children and has worked as a bank employee at the Banco Santander.

He does track and field and has competed in races such as the Ironman Triathlon in Pucón and marathon of Vitacura.

References

External links
 Aldo Alvarado at MemoriaWanderers.cl 
 
 

1961 births
Living people
Sportspeople from Viña del Mar
Chilean footballers
Chilean expatriate footballers
Santiago Wanderers footballers
C.D. Universidad Católica del Ecuador footballers
C.S.D. Macará footballers
Primera B de Chile players
Ecuadorian Serie A players
Ecuadorian Serie B players
Chilean expatriate sportspeople in Ecuador
Expatriate footballers in Ecuador
Association football forwards
Chilean male marathon runners
Chilean male long-distance runners